San Juan Nepomuceno is a town and municipality located in the Bolívar Department, northern Colombia.  It is named after Saint John of Nepomuk.

Notable residents
Mayerlis Angarita was born here in about 1980. She has won awards for her leadership on women's rights and she has been a mayoral candidate.

References

Municipalities of Bolívar Department